Adams Center may refer to places in the United States:

Adams Center, New York, census-designated place
Adams Center, Wisconsin, ghost town
Adams Center (Montana), hall on the campus of the University of Montana